An Kyong-ho (18 January 1930 – January 2016) was a North Korean politician. 

He was born in Gangwon, and is a graduate of Kim Il-sung University in Pyongyang. He formerly served as the Chief Director of the Committee for the Peaceful Reunification of the Fatherland .  He first entered international news in 1988, when he attended South-North preparatory talks. He was a delegate to the 9th and 11th sessions of the Supreme People's Assembly, held in 1990 and 2003.

See also
Politics of North Korea
List of Koreans

References
Yonhap News Agency.  "Who's who in North Korea," pp. 787–812 in

External links
NKChosun profile

1930 births
2016 deaths
Kim Il-sung University
Members of the Supreme People's Assembly
People from Kangwon Province (North Korea)